The 1985 FIBA Club World Cup was the 19th edition of the FIBA Intercontinental Cup for men's basketball clubs. It was the second edition of the competition that was held under the name of FIBA Club World Cup. It took place at Barcelona and Girona. From the FIBA European Champions Cup participated Banco di Roma Virtus, Limoges, Cibona, and FC Barcelona. Also participating were Monte Líbano, San Andrés, and Guantánamo from the South American Club Championship. The Team USA NCAA Olympics Select Team, called the Golden Eagles, took part from the Division I (NCAA), and Maxaquene took part from the FIBA Africa Clubs Champions Cup. The Northern Cement, the Philippines, took part from the FIBA Asia Championship.

Participants

Group stage

Group A 

Day 1, June 23 1985, Barcelona

|}

Day 2, June 24 1985, Barcelona

|}

Day 3, June 25 1985, Barcelona

|}

Day 4, June 26 1985, Barcelona

|}

Day 5, June 27 1985, Barcelona

|}

Group B 

Day 1, June 23 1985, Girona

|}

Day 2, June 24 1985, Girona

|}

Day 3, June 25 1985, Girona

|}

Day 4, June 26 1985, Girona

|}

Day 5, June 27 1985, Girona

|}

Places 1-4

Semi finals 
June 28 1985, Barcelona & Girona

|}

3rd place game 
June 29 1985, Barcelona

|}

Final

Final standings

External links
1985 World Club Cup 

 

1985
1985–86 in Spanish basketball
International basketball competitions hosted by Spain
1985–86 in South American basketball
1985–86 in North American basketball
1985–86 in European basketball
1986 in African basketball
1986 in Philippine basketball
International basketball competitions hosted by Catalonia